Boltaña (in Aragonese: Boltanya) is a municipality located in the province of Huesca, Aragon, Spain. According to the 2004 census (INE), the municipality has a population of 870 inhabitants.

Boltaña is the economic development capital of the Sobrarbe comarca.

References

External links 

 Boltaña Town Hall
 Oficina de Turismo de Boltaña
 Weather
 Feria Pirenaica del Jabalí
 Web de Pirenostrum
 Web de Conspiremus
 Web de a Ronda de Boltaña.
 Castle in Romanicoaragones.com
 Castillos de Aragón
 Web del Palotiau de Boltaña
 News from Boltaña
 Asociación Belenística

Municipalities in the Province of Huesca